Canal 24 Horas (Channel 24 Hours) is a Spanish free-to-air television channel owned and operated by Televisión Española (TVE), the television division of state-owned public broadcaster Radiotelevisión Española (RTVE). It is the corporation's all-news television channel, and is known for its 24-hour rolling news service and its live coverage of breaking news.

It was launched on 15 September 1997 as the first 24-hour rolling television news service in Spain. It was the only one until 27 January 1999, when CNN+ started broadcasting. When CNN+ ceased transmissions on 28 December 2010, Canal 24 Horas became the only nationwide rolling television news service.

Its rolling news service is produced by TVE's news services at its Torrespaña facilities, at the foot of the communications tower. News items are produced, with the footage taken by their own cameramen, by the central newsroom in Torrespaña, by the newsrooms of TVE territorial centers across Spain, by TVE foreign correspondents around the world or by on-the-scene special reporters. They also produce the flagship Telediario news bulletins and factual programmes, such as Informe Semanal, for La 1, La 2 and TVE Internacional that are also broadcast on Canal 24 Horas. The channel simulcasts of Telediario news bulletins provides sign language interpretation.

Distribution
It was initially available on the Vía Digital digital satellite package on the Hispasat satellite at 30° West, and was encrypted, and thus mainly aimed to Spain, although it could also be seen simulcasted by TVE Internacional at certain times of the day. However, it eventually started simulcasting on the Eutelsat Hot Bird and SES Astra satellite system in the clear, moving later to free-to-air digital transmissions on the same satellite at a later date.

Currently, the channel is available on the Astra 1KR and Hispasat 1D satellites at 19.2°E and 30°W respectively as part of the Digital + package for Spain only, on the Eutelsat Hot Bird satellite at 13°E for the whole of Europe, and the Hispasat 1C satellite at 30°W for the Americas until March 2006. Afterward, it will only be possible to receive TVE through Spanish packages offered by Dish Network and DirectTV in the Americas.

Since November 2005, it has also been available on digital terrestrial television in Spain. La 1 simulcasts the channel between 04:00 or 05:00 (local time) and 06:30. During the public holidays or the summer break, it simulcasts until 10:05.

In Europe, it is available free-to-air on Eutelsat Hot Bird 13° East. Due to economic reasons, it moved its satellite distribution for Europe to Astra 19.2°E alongside TVE Internacional and the RTVE radios (RNE Radio Nacional, RNE Radio Clásica, RNE Radio 3, RNE Ràdio 4, RNE Radio 5 and Radio Exterior de España) between January 2014 and January 2020. As of January 1, 2020, it is also available terrestrially in Puerto Rico over the second subchannel of television station WORA-TV.

Presenters

La mañana en 24h (weekdays 10am3pm) 
 Ángeles Bravo
 Alex Barreiro
 Jerónimo Fernández-Pachón 
 Olga Lambea 
 Silvia Laplana (weather)

La tarde en Canal 24h (weekdays 58:35pm) 
 Emilio De Andrés 
 Ana Belén Roy
 Isabel Zubiaurre (weather)

La noche en  Canal 24h (weekdays 10:30pm12:05am) 
 Víctor Arribas
 Lara Siscar 
 Pepe Hervás (culture)
 Ana de Roqu (weather)

Weekday Overnight (12am and then repeat until 6:30am) 
 Paula Sainz-Pardo
 Ana de Roque (weather)

Weekend Morning (88:30am and 9am2:30pm) 
 Beatriz Pérez-Aranda 
 Mercedes Martel

Weekend Afternoon (58:30pm) 
 Marta Ventura

Weekend Overnight (11pm2am and then repeat until 6:30am) 
 Martin Barreiro
 Jesus Amor (weather)

Branding

External links

RTVE website
Canal 24 Horas at LyngSat Address

24-hour television news channels in Spain
RTVE channels
Television channels and stations established in 1997
Spanish-language television stations